Fabio Gavazzi (born 4 April 1988) is an Italian footballer who plays as a defender for  club Vis Pesaro.

Career
On 2 October 2020 he joined Foggia. On 9 July 2021, his contract with Foggia was terminated by mutual consent.

On 13 July 2021 he signed with Vis Pesaro.

References

External links

 

1988 births
Living people
People from Seriate
Footballers from Lombardy
Italian footballers
Association football defenders
Serie C players
Lega Pro Seconda Divisione players
Serie D players
Como 1907 players
Pro Sesto 2013 players
A.C. Renate players
Novara F.C. players
Mantova 1911 players
F.C. Südtirol players
U.C. AlbinoLeffe players
Calcio Foggia 1920 players
Vis Pesaro dal 1898 players